This is a list of FM radio stations in the United States having call signs beginning with the letters WK through WM. Low-power FM radio stations, those with designations such as WKBR-LP, have not been included in this list.

WK--

WL--

WM--

See also
 North American call sign

Lists of radio stations in the United States